Spine Road High School is a school in Rocklands, Mitchell's Plain, a township in Cape Town, South Africa.

History
At the end of the 2014, it became the first school in Mitchell's Plain to achieve a 100% matric pass rate.

References

Schools in Cape Town
Educational institutions established in 1957
1957 establishments in South Africa